Halaf-e Yek (also Romanized as Ḩalāf-e Yek) is a village in Elhayi Rural District, in the Central District of Ahvaz County, Khuzestan Province, Iran. At the 2006 census, its population was 990, in 181 families.

References 

Populated places in Ahvaz County